Jackelin Díaz (born 14 May 1978) is a retired Venezuelan judoka who competed in the 2000 Summer Olympics.

References

1978 births
Living people
Venezuelan female judoka
Olympic judoka of Venezuela
Judoka at the 2000 Summer Olympics
Place of birth missing (living people)